La Chopera is an administrative neighborhood of Madrid belonging to the district of Arganzuela.

Wards of Madrid
Arganzuela